James Samuel Hill (1845 – April 10, 1865) was a soldier in the United States Army during the American Civil War. He received the Medal of Honor.

Biography
Hill was born in 1845 in Lyons, New York and enlisted in the Union Army from the same town.

He served as a sergeant in Company C, 14th New York Heavy Artillery. He was awarded the Medal of Honor for action on July 30, 1864 at Petersburg, Virginia.  He became a prisoner of war later in the war.

Hill died on April 10, 1865, shortly after Lee's surrender at Appomattox, and was buried in East Newark Cemetery in Newark, New York.

Medal of Honor citation
Rank and organization: Sergeant, Company C, 14th New York Heavy Artillery. Place and date: At Petersburg, Va., 30 July 1864

Citation:

Capture of flag, shooting a Confederate officer who was rallying his men with the colors in his hand.

See also
 List of Medal of Honor recipients
 List of American Civil War Medal of Honor recipients: G–L

Notes

References

External links
 

1845 births
1865 deaths
United States Army Medal of Honor recipients
People of New York (state) in the American Civil War
American Civil War recipients of the Medal of Honor
Union Army non-commissioned officers
Union military personnel killed in the American Civil War